William Ellsworth Hunter (July 8, 1887 – April 10, 1934) was a Major League Baseball outfielder who played for one season. He played in 21 games for the Cleveland Naps during the 1912 season. His twin brother, George Hunter, also played professional baseball.

References

External links

1887 births
1934 deaths
Cleveland Naps players
Major League Baseball outfielders
Towson Tigers baseball players
Charlotte Hornets (baseball) players
Wilkes-Barre Barons (baseball) players
Keokuk Indians players
Rock Island Islanders players
Brandon Angels players
Flint Vehicles players
Des Moines Boosters players
Hamilton Tigers (baseball) players
Baseball players from Buffalo, New York
Twin sportspeople